Kedesh (alternate spellings: Cadesh, Cydessa) was an ancient Canaanite and later Israelite settlement in Upper Galilee, mentioned few times in the Hebrew Bible. Its remains are located in Tel Kedesh, 3 km northeast of the modern Kibbutz Malkiya in Israel on the Israeli-Lebanese border.

History
Kedesh was first documented in the Book of Joshua as a Canaanite citadel conquered by the Israelites under the leadership of Joshua. Ownership of Kedesh was turned over by lot to the Tribe of Naphtali and subsequently, at the command of God, Kedesh was set apart by Joshua as a Levitical city and one of the Cities of Refuge along with Shechem and Kiriath Arba (Hebron).

In the 8th century BCE, during the reign of Pekah king of Israel, Tiglath-Pileser III of Assyria took Kedesh and deported its inhabitants to Assyria.

Later, during the 5th century BCE, Kedesh may have become the capital for the Persian-controlled and Tyrian-administrated province of the Upper Galilee.

In 259 BCE Kedesh was mentioned by Zenon, a traveling merchant from Egypt.

Between 145 BCE and 143 BCE, Kedesh (Cades) was overthrown by Jonathan Maccabeus in his fight against Seleucid king Demetrius II Nicator. It remains abandoned. From 1997 to 2012, Tel Kedesh was excavated by a team from the University of Michigan's Kelsey Museum of Archaeology in conjunction with the University of Minnesota, focusing in 2010 and 2012 on the Persian and Hellenistic Administrative Building.

According to Jewish tradition, Deborah the prophetess, Barak the son of Abinoam and Jael, the wife of Heber the Kenite, as also Heber, were buried near the spring beneath the town of Kedesh.

Eusebius, writing about the place in his Onomasticon, says: "Kedesh. A priestly city in the inheritance of Naphtali. Previously it was a city of refuge 'in Galilee in the hill country of Naphtali.' The 'king of the Assyrians' destroyed it (2 Kings 15:29). This is (now) Kydissos (Κυδισσός), twenty miles from Tyre near Paneas."

Kedesh of Naphtali
Identification of the biblical "Kedesh of Naphtali" (Judges 4:6, 10) has been the subject of archaeological and historical debate. While many hold the ancient site to be in Upper Galilee, near the Lebanese border, Israeli archaeologist, Yohanan Aharoni, held the view that it lay in Lower Galilee, near the Valley of Jezreel, at a site which bears the same name (now Khirbet Qadish). Some prominent archaeological publications have, therefore, listed the site as being east of the "Jabneel valley" in "Lower Galilee."

From 1997–2010, archaeological excavations were conducted at the Kedesh-Naphtali (Qadesh) site by Herbert Sharon and Andrea Berlin on behalf of the University of Michigan.

Middle Ages
Ishtori Haparchi, visiting the holy sites in the early fourteenth-century wrote of Kedesh: "About half a day's distance southward of Paneas, known in Arabic as Banias, is Kedesh, in the mountain of Naphtali, and it is [now] called Qades."

Other
In the Book of Judges, the great oak tree in Zaanaim is stated to be near Kedesh, though this verse could be a reference to a second Tel Kedesh, located 3 km to the south of Megiddo, within the territory of the Israelite tribe of Issachar.

See also
 Qadas
 Al-Malkiyya

References

Bibliography

External links
Photos of the ruins at Tel Kedesh from the Manar al-Athar photo archive

Hebrew Bible cities
Torah cities
Levitical cities
Canaanite cities
Former populated places in Southwest Asia
Buildings and structures in Northern District (Israel)
Tells (archaeology)
Biblical geography